The 2022–23 Dallas Stars season is the 56th season for National Hockey League franchise that was established on June 5, 1967, and the 30th season since the franchise relocated from Minnesota prior to the start of the 1993–94 NHL season. The first game of the season was played at Bridgestone Arena against the Nashville Predators on October 13, 2022, with the first home game against the Predators at American Airlines Center on October 15, 2022. During the offseason, Rick Bowness resigned as head coach of the Stars, and Peter DeBoer was hired to replace him.

Standings

Divisional standings

Conference standings

Schedule and results

Preseason 
The Stars Preseason schedule was released on July 5, 2022.

Regular season
The regular season schedule was released on July 6, 2022.

Roster

Transactions
The Stars have been involved in the following transactions during the 2022–23 season.

Key:

 Contract is entry-level.
 Contract initially takes effect in the 2023–24 season.

Trades

Notes:
 If Dallas' 1st-round pick is within the top 10 selections, New York will instead receive Dallas' 1st-round pick in 2024.
 If Lundkvist accumulates a combined 55 points over the 2022–23 and 2023–24 seasons, New York will instead receive Dallas' 3rd-round pick in 2025.

Players acquired

Players lost

Signings

Draft picks

Below are the Dallas Stars' selections at the 2022 NHL Entry Draft, which was held on July 7 to 8, 2022, at Bell Centre in Montreal.

References

Dallas Stars seasons
Dallas Stars
Dallas Stars
Dallas Stars